Laevilitorina hamiltoni is a species of sea snail, a marine gastropod mollusk in the family Littorinidae, the winkles or periwinkles.

Laevilitorina (Macquariella) hamiltoni (E. A. Smith, 1898) is an accepted, alternate representation of Macquariella hamiltoni (E. A. Smith, 1898)

Description

Distribution

References

Littorinidae
Gastropods described in 1898